47th regiment may refer to:

47th (Lancashire) Regiment of Foot, a British Army infantry regiment
47th Regiment Royal Artillery, a British Army artillery regiment
47th (Oldham) Royal Tank Regiment, a British Army armoured regiment
47th Sikhs, a British Indian Army regiment
47th Palma Light Infantry Regiment, a Spanish Army infantry regiment
47th Infantry Regiment (United States), a US Army regiment

 American Civil War
47th Illinois Volunteer Infantry Regiment
47th Wisconsin Volunteer Infantry Regiment
47th Iowa Volunteer Infantry Regiment
47th Indiana Infantry Regiment
47th United States Colored Infantry Regiment
47th Missouri Volunteer Infantry
47th Regiment Kentucky Volunteer Mounted Infantry
47th Pennsylvania Infantry Regiment
47th New York Volunteer Infantry

47th Tennessee Infantry Regiment
47th Arkansas Infantry (Mounted)
47th Virginia Infantry
47th Georgia Volunteer Infantry